Multivision Comet Cable was a pay TV service started in 1997 in Colombo Sri Lanka.
The service was provided using Analog MMDS Technology. It was mainly available within the Colombo City Limits and had around 20 channels. The service was closed down when the company went bankrupt in 2008

Services
The service had about 20 channels during its period of operation. The service could be received with a monthly subscription using a MMDS Antenna and Decoder Unit.

Channel Lineup
HBO
CNN International
BBC World News
ESPN
STAR Sports
TEN Sports
AXN
STAR World
Hallmark Channel
TNT
MTV
VH1
National Geographical Channel
Discovery Channel
Animal Planet
Cartoon Network
Nickelodeon
NHK World Premium
Kermit Channel
STAR Plus

Cable television companies
Television in Sri Lanka